Myanmar participated at the 2018 Summer Youth Olympics in Buenos Aires, Argentina from 6 October to 18 October 2018.

Competitors

Archery

Individual

Team

Sailing

Myanmar was given one boat to compete by the tripartite committee.

Boys

References

Nations at the 2018 Summer Youth Olympics
Myanmar at the Youth Olympics 
2018 in Burmese sport